The Greasy Strangler is a 2016 American black comedy horror film directed by Jim Hosking, and written by Hosking and Toby Harvard. The film stars Michael St. Michaels, Sky Elobar, Elizabeth De Razzo, Gil Gex, Abdoulaye NGom and Holland MacFallister. The film was released on October 7, 2016 by FilmRise.

Plot
Big Ronnie, a pathological liar who fabricates stories about disco groups like the Bee Gees, runs a disco-themed walking location tour in his town, alongside his son Big Brayden, who aspires to be a space fantasy author. Ronnie allows Brayden to live with him on the condition that Brayden prepares excessively greasy food for him. Ronnie asserts that Brayden drove his mother away, though truthfully, she left Ronnie for a man named Ricky Prickles.

At night, Ronnie completely covers himself in grease and strangles residents of the town, soon becoming dubbed "The Greasy Strangler." After his killings, he cleans himself of the grease by standing in a car wash run by a blind man named Big Paul. During one of the walking tours, Brayden meets a woman named Janet, and they begin a romantic relationship. One night, Ronnie strangles a hot dog vendor he had gotten in an argument with earlier, causing his eyes to pop out of his head, which Ronnie cooks and eats.

One night, Brayden and Janet have sex. Ronnie attempts to seduce her the next morning before he kills Oinker, Brayden's best friend. He later takes Janet out to a discotheque, threatening to evict Brayden if he does not allow him to. There, Ronnie attempts to kiss Janet, but she resists, saying that she may be in love with Brayden. Ronnie later has sex with Janet. They mock Brayden when he runs from the house in despair. This later leads to a heated argument between Ronnie and Brayden.

One night, Brayden professes his love to Janet. Ronnie overhears this before going to the car wash to strangle and decapitate Paul. The next morning, Brayden calls a detective named Jody and reports that Ronnie may be the Greasy Strangler. Jody - who is actually Ronnie in disguise - visits the house the next day, and Brayden and Janet show him a spot of oil left behind on the carpet as evidence that Ronnie is the Greasy Strangler. Jody concludes that the oil is meaningless circumstantial evidence, and demands that they end all inquiries about Ronnie having committed the murders.

That night, Janet declares her mutual love for Brayden, and they decide to get married. Ronnie, hiding under the bed, reveals himself, claiming Janet as his lover and evicting Brayden. Janet replies that Brayden can live with him. Ronnie covers himself in grease, slaps Brayden, and drags Janet out of the house with him. Brayden covers himself in grease as well and follows the two to a movie theatre, where Ronnie is strangling Janet. Brayden strangles her instead. Her eyes pop out of her head, which both he and Ronnie consume.

The next day, on a beach, Ronnie reveals that he cares for Brayden, despite his annoyance with him. They bond over, in hindsight, their disgust with Janet. They cover themselves in grease and head to a forest where they murder Ricky Prickles. They then witness themselves being executed by firing squad, watching as confetti and champagne explode from their heads. They venture deeper into the forest, still covered in grease, and primally shake wooden spears at the camera.

Cast

 Michael St. Michaels as Big Ronnie
 Sky Elobar as Big Brayden
 Elizabeth De Razzo as Janet
 Gil Gex as Big Paul
 Joe David Walters as Oinker
 Sam Dissanayake as Indian Tourist
 Abdoulaye N'Gom as Senegalese Tourist
 Holland MacFallister as Scandinavian Tourist
 Mel Kohl as Hot Dog Vendor
 Carl Solomon as Danny The Crooner
 Sal Koussa as Ricky Prickles
 Dana Haas as Big Heinie
 Jesse Keen as Big Thaddeus
 John Yuan as Hot Dog Mourner
 Matthew Yuan as Hot Dog Mourner

Release
The Greasy Strangler premiered at the 2016 Sundance Film Festival on January 22, 2016. The film was released on October 7, 2016, by FilmRise.

Critical reception
The film received mixed reviews from critics. , it has a 63% approval rating on review aggregator website Rotten Tomatoes, based on 52 reviews, with an average score of 5.59/10. The site's consensus states: "The Greasy Strangler definitely isn't for everyone, but filmgoers in step with its off-kilter stride are in store for a singular cinematic experience." On Metacritic, the film has a 58 out of 100 rating, based on 13 critics, indicating "mixed or average reviews".

Jordan Hoffman, film critic of the British newspaper The Guardian, described the film as "the relentless monstrosity of a film is rife with fetishized cellulite, disgusting food and firehose penises. It’s not for everyone – but perhaps it should be", in a four-star review.

Peter Bradshaw, film critic of the British newspaper The Guardian, described the film as providing "uncompromising yuckiness" as well as laughs, in a three-star review.

James Franco wrote an article about The Greasy Strangler for his 'James Franco's Movie Column' in Indiewire: "Fake Penises Aren’t the Only Funny Thing About The Greasy Strangler."

The Greasy Strangler won The Discovery Award at the British Independent Film Awards 2017.

The Greasy Strangler won Best Comedy at The Empire Magazine Film Awards 2017.

References

External links
 
 
 
 

2016 films
2016 comedy horror films
American independent films
2016 independent films
2016 black comedy films
2010s serial killer films
American black comedy films
American comedy horror films
American serial killer films
American slasher films
2010s English-language films
2010s American films